Chemokine (C-C motif) ligand 14 (CCL14) is a small cytokine belonging to the CC chemokine family. It is also commonly known as HCC-1.  It is produced as a protein precursor that is processed to generate a mature active protein containing 74 amino acids that and is 46% identical in amino acid composition to CCL3 and CCL4.  This chemokine is expressed in various tissues including spleen, bone marrow, liver, muscle, and gut.  CCL14 activates monocytes, but does not induce their chemotaxis. Human CCL14 is located on chromosome 17 within a cluster of other chemokines belonging to the CC family.

References

Cytokines